Playing with Fire is the third studio album by Spacemen 3, released in February 1989. The original CD version included two live bonus tracks recorded in the Netherlands, and an ensuing release on Taang! Records included two more b-sides from the "Revolution" single. A reissued version from 2001 has an entire extra disc of demos and rarities. The album was featured in Robert Dimery's 1001 Albums You Must Hear Before You Die.

In a similar musical borrowing to those on the band's prior albums, the song "Revolution" bears more than a passing resemblance to "Black to Comm" by the MC5.

Reception

Stereogum placed "Revolution" at twentieth in their list of the "31 Essential Shoegaze Tracks".

Track listing
Original release (Fire FIRELP16)

2001 reissue (Space Age Recordings)

References

External links
 Album online on Radio3Net a radio channel of Romanian Radio Broadcasting Company

1989 albums
Spacemen 3 albums
Fire Records (UK) albums
Bomp! Records albums
Rough Trade Records albums
Taang! Records albums